Neomolgus is a genus of snout mites in the family Bdellidae. There are more than 20 described species in Neomolgus.

Species
These 29 species belong to the genus Neomolgus:

 Neomolgus aegyptiacus Soliman, 1975
 Neomolgus aequalis (Schweizer & Bader, 1963)
 Neomolgus anomalicornis (Berlese, 1916)
 Neomolgus berlesei (Trägårdh, 1902)
 Neomolgus calandroides (Murray, 1878)
 Neomolgus capillatus (Kramer, 1881)
 Neomolgus clypeatus (Thor, 1930)
 Neomolgus egregius Koch, 1839 (C.L.)
 Neomolgus helveticus (Schweizer & Bader, 1963)
 Neomolgus iraniensis Eghbalian, Khanjani, Safaralizadeh & Ueckermann
 Neomolgus lacustris (Hull, 1915)
 Neomolgus littoralis (Linnaeus)
 Neomolgus longipalpis (Karpelles, 1893)
 Neomolgus longipalpus Kuznetzov, 1984
 Neomolgus lumarius Atyeo & Tuxen, 1962
 Neomolgus maculatus (Karpelles, 1893)
 Neomolgus monticola Willmann, 1951
 Neomolgus mutabilis Atyeo, 1960
 Neomolgus obsoletus (Berlese, 1923)
 Neomolgus opimus (Berlese, 1923)
 Neomolgus pallipes Koch, 1879 (L.)
 Neomolgus paracappilatus Michocka, 1987
 Neomolgus peragilis (Berlese, 1923)
 Neomolgus pygmaeus Shiba, 1969
 Neomolgus raeticus (Schweizer & Bader, 1963)
 Neomolgus raptor Kuznetzov & Barilo, 1984
 Neomolgus reticulatus (Schweizer & Bader, 1963)
 Neomolgus thorianus (Berlese, 1923)
 Neomolgus venetus Lombardini, 1960

References

Further reading

 

Trombidiformes
Articles created by Qbugbot